The 2014 Belarusian Premier League (women) was the 24th season of women's league football under the Football Federation of Belarus.

The league was won by FC Minsk, its second consecutive title. By winning, FC Minsk qualified to 2015–16 UEFA Women's Champions League.

With two clubs, Viktorya-86 Brest and FK Molodechno, withdrawing from the league, 7 club contested, playing 24 matches each.

League table

Top scorers

References

External links
 Premier League Women 2014 Soccrway

 

Belarus
Belarus
2014 in Belarusian football